The Macgregor Kilpatrick Trophy is presented annually to the AHL team that finishes the regular season with the most points or highest points percentage. The award is named after late former AHL board member Macgregor Kilpatrick.

The award was first presented for the 1997–98 season, the season after Kilpatrick died. Prior to the current trophy, the F. G. "Teddy" Oke Trophy was awarded from 1952–53 to 1960–61 and in 1976–77 to the team which finished first overall in the AHL, though at the time the league only had a single division.

Winners 
 Team won the Calder Cup   Team lost the Calder Cup finals

Before the trophy
The following is a list of teams finishing first overall in the American Hockey League standings by season, prior to the institution of the Macgregor Kilpatrick Trophy. From the 1952–53 season until the 1960–61 season, as well as the 1976–77 season, the F. G. "Teddy" Oke Trophy was awarded to the team with the league leading record.

External links
Official AHL website
AHL Hall of Fame

American Hockey League trophies and awards